Rhyparidella is a genus of leaf beetles in the subfamily Eumolpinae. It is distributed in New Guinea and New Britain.

Species
 Rhyparidella arachi (Gressitt, 1964)
 Rhyparidella aviceps Gressitt, 1969
 Rhyparidella bicolor Gressitt, 1969
 Rhyparidella cacaona (Gressitt, 1966)
 Rhyparidella casuarinae (Gressitt, 1964)
 Rhyparidella cobaltina Gressitt, 1969
 Rhyparidella corpulenta Gressitt, 1969
 Rhyparidella fakfaka Gressitt, 1969
 Rhyparidella fordi Gressitt, 1969
 Rhyparidella fulva Medvedev, 2009
 Rhyparidella hibisci (Gressitt, 1964)
 Rhyparidella nigripennis Medvedev, 2009
 Rhyparidella ovipennis Medvedev, 2009
 Rhyparidella quadripustulata (Jacoby, 1884)
 Rhyparidella riedeli Medvedev, 2009
 Rhyparidella rufocapitis Medvedev, 2009
 Rhyparidella rufometallica Gressitt, 1969
 Rhyparidella sewana Gressitt, 1969
 Rhyparidella sobrina (Bryant, 1950)
 Rhyparidella suturalis Medvedev, 2009
 Rhyparidella wauensis Gressitt, 1969
 Rhyparidella weisei Medvedev, 2009

References

Eumolpinae
Chrysomelidae genera
Beetles of Oceania
Insects of New Guinea